The Absolute Game is the third studio album by Scottish punk rock and new wave band Skids. Recorded in 1980 and produced by Mick Glossop, it was released in September 1980 by record label Virgin. It became their most commercially successful album, reaching No. 9 in the UK Albums Chart.

Writing and recording 

This album marks the first collaborative effort between Richard Jobson and new bassist Russell Webb, who continued to work together in the band The Armoury Show and also on Jobson's solo album Badman.

Musical style 

Alex Ogg of AllMusic opined "Musically, the Skids were branching out and writing some illustrious pop tunes."

Controversy 

Initial copies came with a limited edition second disc entitled Strength Through Joy, a collection of material recorded during The Absolute Game sessions but omitted from the album. Its songs apparently feature members of the band playing each other's instruments. Richard Jobson, the Skids' lead singer, later stated that this title had been taken from Dirk Bogarde's autobiography and was not based on the Nazi slogan "Kraft durch Freude". However, it continued in the controversial theme of the first release of Days in Europa, which had also been withdrawn after accusations of Nazi glorification.

Release 

The Absolute Game was released in September 1980, preceded by the release of Circus Games as a single in August. It reached No. 9 in the UK Albums Chart.

Around this time the band was riven by internal rifts and disagreements, leading to various changes in personnel. Soon after the release and tour of The Absolute Game, Adamson and Baillie left the band.

Reception 

Shane Baldwin of Record Collector called it "their finest work, despite the fact that, by then, Jobson and Adamson's relationship had begun to founder. Endlessly inventive and perfectly executed, it deservedly became their most successful release". Ira Robbins of Trouser Press wrote "Parts of The Absolute Game are just arty pretense, but the inclusion of substantial, engaging material makes it a reasonable addition to the collection."

Track listing

Strength Through Joy

Personnel 

 Skids

 Richard Jobson – vocals, guitar
 Stuart Adamson – guitar, vocals, keyboards, percussion
 Russell Webb – bass guitar, vocals, keyboards, percussion
 Mike Baillie – drums, vocals, percussion

 Additional personnel

 Jude Nettleton – vocals
 Julius Newell – vocals
 Andrew Sigsworth – vocals
 John Sigsworth – vocals
 Alison Pipkin – vocals
 David Pipkin – vocals
 Hannah Yeadon – vocals
 Esther Marshall – vocals
 Chloe Dymott – vocals
 Marlis Dunklau – vocals
 Gracie Benson – vocals
 Sally Nettleton – vocals
 Harriet Bakewell – vocals
 Mary Volke – vocals
 Derek Wadsworth – didgeridoo

References

External links 

 

Skids (band) albums
1980 albums
Virgin Records albums